Equipoise is an album by guitarist Larry Coryell which was recorded in 1985 and released on the Muse label.

Track listing
All compositions by Larry Coryell except where noted
 "Unemployed Floyd" – 6:50
 "Tender Tears" – 8:07
 "Equipoise" – 4:43
 "Christina" (Buster Williams) – 5:15
 "Joy Spring" (Clifford Brown) – 6:41
 "First Things First" – 6:59

Personnel
Larry Coryell – guitar
Stanley Cowell – piano 
Buster Williams – bass 
Billy Hart – drums
Pamela Sklar – flute (track 1)

References

Muse Records albums
Larry Coryell albums
1986 albums
Albums recorded at Van Gelder Studio